Froome is a surname. Notable people with the surname include:

Chris Froome (born 1985), British road racing cyclist
Keith Froome (1920–1978), Australian rugby league player

See also
Frome, a town in Somerset, England
Frome (disambiguation)
Froom (disambiguation)